United Nations Security Council Resolution 396, adopted on October 22, 1976, considered a report by the Secretary-General regarding the United Nations Disengagement Observer Force and noted the discussions the Secretary-General had had with all the concerned parties in the Middle East situation.  The Council expressed its concern over the continuing tension in the area and decided:

(a) To renew the mandate of the United Nations Disengagement Observer Force for another year, until October 24, 1977;
(b) To request that the Secretary-General keep the Security Council informed on further developments;
(c) To call upon all parties to immediately implement resolution 338 (1973).

The Council adopted the resolution by 13 votes to none; China and Libya did not participate in the vote.

See also
 Arab–Israeli conflict
 Egypt–Israel relations
 List of United Nations Security Council Resolutions 301 to 400 (1971–1976)

References
Text of the Resolution at undocs.org

External links
 

 0396
 0396
Middle East peace efforts
 0396
October 1976 events